Winthrop Center, is a skyscraper in Boston, Massachusetts, United States. When completed, Winthrop Center would stand as the fourth-tallest building in Boston, Massachusetts. The tower is being built on the site of the defunct Winthrop Square Garage in the Financial District.

History
While planning the Winthrop Square Tower, six developers pitched designs to the Boston Redevelopment Authority, where the design by the Millennium Partners was chosen in August of 2016.

On October 26, 2016, the Boston Redevelopment Agency approved the construction of the tower.

On October 18, 2018 Millennium Partners announced a groundbreaking date for October 24, 2018 and changing the name from “Winthrop Square Tower” to “Winthrop Center”. The completion of the tower is planned for March 2023.

One Winthrop Square Park redevelopment 
Winthrop Square to receive enhancements in connection with tower construction, and with that, Millennium Partners decided to redevelop the heart of Winthrop Square Park. It would include street trees, a water feature, granite paving, flowering understory trees, canopy trees, sculptural benches and a pedestrian connection to Winthrop Center.

Controversy
Many activists and residents in the city have opposed the building's construction, as the building as originally proposed would create a large shadow on Boston Common for at least 90 minutes on some mornings. This would break a state law that prohibits shadows on Boston Common or the Public Garden. The tower was also scrutinized by Massport, claiming that the tower's height would interfere with air traffic from Logan Airport. Boston Mayor Marty Walsh has stated that he wishes to modify the state law prohibiting the building's construction, to allow the construction of the tower but to prevent future developments in the area.

The planned height of the building was altered in September 2017, to comply with the Federal Aviation Administration's declaration that the building's proposed height was too tall and would, therefore, disrupt flights from Logan International Airport.

See also
 List of tallest buildings in Boston

References

PDFs:
 http://www.bostonplans.org/getattachment/db054d88-6a72-45fc-bed8-6b98eda8161b
 http://www.bostonplans.org/getattachment/ddf78729-e352-42e2-a3d1-5bf05babe6c9
 http://www.bostonplans.org/getattachment/57105d1c-74af-47e0-9caa-3a6f143bb809
 http://www.bostonplans.org/getattachment/af18f125-8e21-4387-a7fa-0d3707c37d7b
 http://www.bostonplans.org/getattachment/1df9eb07-9ff7-47b2-93dc-cfcbc0197323
 http://www.bostonplans.org/getattachment/59bd6382-8ebe-4142-8663-86e2fcaf6963
 http://www.bostonplans.org/getattachment/6ae08631-117f-414c-9e4c-eb4255f28057

External links
 Tim Logan, Boston Globe, January 3, 2018: Revised plans for Winthrop Square tower don’t go to such great heights

Proposed skyscrapers in the United States
Skyscrapers in Boston